Mary Bruins Allison (March 19, 1903 – September 15, 1994) was one of the first American women to be trained in medicine in the United States to work as a missionary physician in Arabia. While attending medical college in Philadelphia, she learned Arabic. In 1934, she went to the Middle East to work as a missionary physician. In her forty-year long career, she worked primarily in Kuwait, as well as India, Qatar, Bahrain and Oman. In her capacity in Kuwait, she treated rich and poor women.

To be successful, she had to overcome a number of obstacles, including limited trained medical staff, insufficient medical resources, as well as barriers due to cultural, lingual and religious differences. She made significant contributions in establishing modern medical care in the countries where she worked; Allison was asked by the rulers of Bahrain and Oman to help establish hospitals in their countries. She returned to the United States in 1975.

Early life and education

On March 19, 1903, Mary Bruins was born in Holland, Michigan to Henry Bruins and Mary Huizinga.  In 1907, her father accepted a position as minister at the First Reformed Church in Milwaukee, Wisconsin. The Bruins family moved in 1917 to Pella, Iowa and she attended Pella High School.

In the fall of 1922, she began her studies at Central College in Pella. She joined the Woman's Medical College of Pennsylvania in Philadelphia in the fall of 1928.  In 1932, she interned at Wisconsin General Hospital in Madison, Wisconsin. She studied Arabic from 1933 to 1934 at Hartford Theological School. In 1934, she did her second internship at the University of Illinois at Chicago in obstetrics.

Career

Kuwait

Allison arrived in Kuwait City, Kuwait in 1934. In the beginning, she studied Arabic in the mornings and then worked at the mission. The hospital was built land by the Kuwait Bay that was provided by Shaikh Mubarak, who had invited the Arabian Mission to run a hospital in the city.

Due to cultural constraints, Allison generally treated women. Her patients were of all social classes, from the richest woman who was her first patient, to the poorest Kuwaiti women originally from Iran. Allison was required to first attend to the VIP, or aristocratic women, who she charged an extra fee for the convenience.

It was a cultural norm for women to have their babies at their home or their mother's home, and professional medical attention was not sought unless there was a problem. This meant that when Allison handled deliveries, they were more likely to be due to prenatal complications. To treat these cases, Dr. Allison often needed to leave the hospital to make house calls. Some women died due to complications in their homes. Over time, more pregnant women went to the hospital for prenatal care and delivery.

Several places
In 1940, Allison followed her husband to India, where she worked for two years. She then returned to the United States and worked at a medical practice in New Jersey. In 1943, she rejoined her husband in India, and despite their decision to divorce, she stayed and worked at Dahanu Mission Hospital till 1945. She decided to return to Kuwait because she preferred it there. In 1948, a request to establish a hospital in Doha was made by the sheikh of Qatar, where Allison worked for four months.  In 1964, a medical malpractice complaint was filed against Allison; this subsequently led to the end of her career in Kuwait. She was transferred to Bahrain in 1964.

Around 1967, the Church began to question why it conducted missions in areas where people were not converting to Christianity. Some board members of the Reformed Church Board further wondered why the church provided medical care to an oil rich country. In March 1967, the medical mission was closed.

Bahrain and Oman
By 1970, Allison had worked in Bahrain for five years and was over sixty-five years old, the retirement age for a missionary. Reluctantly, she retired from Bahrain and returned to the U.S. In 1971, however, she received a call that said that the mission board requested that she work at the Mutrah Hospital in Oman. The Sultan wanted to run free hospitals but did not have sufficient medical staff. She treated many diseases, including malaria, leprosy and the cholera epidemic of 1974. She retired for the last time in 1974 and moved in 1975 to Redlands, California.

Personal life
She met her British husband Norman Allison in 1937. The two got married on June 14, 1937 and later divorced in 1943.

Death
Allison died on September 15, 1994.

Notes

References

Sources
 
 
 
 
 
 
 
 
 
 
 
 

1903 births
1994 deaths
Physicians from Michigan
Female Christian missionaries
Christian medical missionaries
American Protestant missionaries
Protestant missionaries in Kuwait
Protestant missionaries in India
Protestant missionaries in Qatar
Protestant missionaries in Iran
Protestant missionaries in Bahrain
Protestant missionaries in Oman
People from Holland, Michigan
American expatriates in Kuwait
20th-century American physicians
20th-century American women physicians